Calliandra purpurea, the soldierwood, is a species of flowering plants of the genus Calliandra in the family Fabaceae.

References

purpurea
Taxa named by George Bentham